The Henneke horse body condition scoring system is a numerical scale used to evaluate the amount of fat on a horse's body. It was developed in the early 1980s by Don Henneke at Texas A&M University with the goal of creating a universal scale to assess horses' bodyweight, and was first published in 1983. It is a standardized system that can be used across all breeds without specialized equipment; condition is assessed visually and by palpation.  Scores range from 1 to 9 with one being poor and nine being extremely fat; the ideal range for most horses is from 4 to 6. The system is based on both visual appraisal and palpable fat cover of the six major points of the horse.  The system is used by law enforcement agencies as an objective method of scoring a horse's body condition in horse cruelty cases.

The concept of a body condition score (BCS) has been adapted for other livestock, especially cattle. Obesity in cats and dogs can be relatively easily diagnosed this way.

Scoring system
The Henneke scale describes body condition scores as follows:

Ideal scores
The average horse is healthiest with a body condition score between 4 and 5 (breed dependent), which indicate that the horse has a proper balance of feed to exercise. An easy keeper or hard keeper should be watched closely as they are prone to either being overweight or underweight, respectively.

Breeding mares
Breeding mares with a body condition score less than five have been linked in research to problems with reproduction.  The energy demands of milk production for a foal are very high, so most mares will lose condition while lactating. Also, a mare with a body condition score less than five will have more difficulty conceiving.  For these reasons, recommendations are for breeding mares to score between 6 and 7.  Higher body condition scores have not been shown to affect reproduction but are unhealthy for the horse.

Stallions
Stallions have the best reproductive success at a body condition score of 5 or 6. Stallions have a high energy output during breeding season so some advise a stallion begin the breeding season at a 6 or 7  to keep him within the healthy range at the end of the breeding season.  If a stallion has a body condition score less than 3 or greater than 8, reproductive performance is compromised.

Performance horses
There has not been much research on the connection between body condition score and performance ability in horses so optimum scores are unknown.  However, horses with a low body condition score lack the fat reserves for strenuous work and also may lack lean muscle. Horses with a very high body condition score carry too much weight, which interferes with stamina and biomechanics.

Some studies addressed the relationship of body condition score and endurance performance in endurance races. In a study of the 1990 Purina Race of Champions (a 241-km / 150-mile, 2-day endurance race), it was found that the top-7 finishers of the race (i.e. highly competitive horses) had significantly lower body condition scores and marginally less rump fat than horses eliminated for metabolic criteria (i.e. less competitive horses).

By contrast, two studies on the Tevis Cup (a 160-km / 100-mile 24-hour race held each August near Truckee, California) found both for 1995 and 1996 (study 1) and for 1998 (study 2), that significantly more horses finished the race when they had a higher (vs. lower) body condition score: Horses competing in 1995 and 1996 had body condition scores ranging from 1.5 to 5.5 (1998: 2.5 to 5.5); no horses with a score of ≤ 2.5 (1998: scores ≤ 3) finished the respective race, and all horses with a score of 5.5 (same in 1998) finished the respective race. 
In both studies, no significant relationship was found between the horse's weight and their time to require the course (or, if they were eliminated: the miles they completed before elimination). The studies did not find a significant effect for the influence of rider weight on the race results; for 1998, the rider weight / horse's body weight ratio was significantly higher among horses qualified for metabolic criteria than for race finishers (however no significant effect on placing of the finishers). The authors discuss for their first study the role of substrate depletion at sub-maximal exercise levels, but also the possibility that horses had a negative energy intake before the race due to their high exercise levels, possibly also leading to a decrease in muscle mass. They explain the differences of results between the studies in part in that the participating horses of the 1990 Purina Race of Champions have had to qualify before and present a more highly-performing field of horses. Both Tevis Cup studies found that horses with a higher body condition score had, however, a significantly higher rate of not finishing the race due to lameness.

Horses on winter pasture
Horses on pasture should enter the winter season at a body condition score of 6 or 7.  On extremely cold days, a horse cannot eat enough food to balance the energy requirements of maintaining body heat so condition is often lost over winter.

Management
Monitoring a horse's body condition may alert a horse owner or barn manager to potential health or management issues.  Body condition score can be affected by a variety of factors such as feed intake, weather, exercise, metabolic diseases like equine metabolic syndrome, pituitary pars intermedia dysfunction, illness, tooth issues, parasitic infections, reproduction, and many others.  Appropriate horse care allows a proper body condition to be maintained in the horse.

References

External links

	
  pages 6–10
 CBD Oil For Horses

Horse health